How To may refer to:

 An owner's manual
 A tutorial
 A user guide
 How To: Absurd Scientific Advice for Common Real-World Problems, a 2019 book by Randall Munroe
 How To with John Wilson, a 2020 HBO comedy docuseries
 How 2, an educational television series
 HOWTO documents, part of the Linux Documentation Project
 HowTo, a satirical wiki project, see 
 HowTo.tv, a video website

See also 
 
 
 
 Method (disambiguation)
 wikiHow
 HowToBasic